HMS Palliser (F94) was one of a dozen Blackwood class frigates (also known as the Type 14-class) of second-rate anti-submarine frigates built for the Royal Navy in the 1950s. She was named for Hugh Palliser, who served during the Seven Years' War and was First Naval Lord during the American War of Independence

Description
The ships were powered by one English Electric geared steam turbine that drove the single propeller shaft, using steam provided by two Babcock & Wilcox boilers. Their complement was 140 officers and ratings.

The ships were armed with three Bofors 40 mm guns in single mounts. The mount on the quarterdeck was later removed as it was unusable in heavy seas. The first four ships to be completed, including Blackwood, were fitted with two above-water twin mounts for  anti-submarine homing torpedoes, but these were removed in the early 1960s. They were equipped with two triple-barrelled Limbo Mark 10 anti-submarine mortars. The Blackwood-class ships had the same sonar suite as the larger s where the Limbo mortars were controlled by three sonars, the Type 174 search set, Type 162 target-classification set and the Type 170 'pencil beam' targeting set to determine the bearing and depth of the target.

Construction and career
Palliser was laid down at Alexander Stephen and Sons' Linthouse, Glasgow shipyard on 15 March 1955. She was launched on 10 May 1956 and completed on 13 December 1957. On commissioning, Palliser joined the Fishery Protection Squadron, serving with the squadron until April 1967. As such she took part in the Cod Wars of the late 1950s and 1960s.

On 22 January 1971, Palliser was recommissioned into the 2nd Frigate Squadron based at Portland Harbour. In May 1973 she was paid off and laid up for disposal. In 1983 Palliser was to be scrapped at S Dean and Sons at Briton Ferry, Neath. Initial attempts to tow the frigate from Portsmouth were delayed by fog, and when on 9 February 1983, the tug Alnwick took Palliser in tow, Alnwick collided with Palliser, damaging the tug and forcing the two ships into Plymouth for repairs. When the tow recommenced, fog caused it to be stopped when the ships reached Swansea Bay, forcing the ships to miss the correct tide, causing a further delay of a week. When the ships finally reached Neath on 27 March 1983, Palliser ran aground before finally making it to the breakers.

Notes

Bibliography

 

 

Blackwood-class frigates
1956 ships
Ships of the Fishery Protection Squadron of the United Kingdom